Capitol View may refer to a location in the United States:

 Capitol View (Washington, D.C.), a neighborhood
 Capitol View (building), a building in Washington, D.C.
 Capitol View (Atlanta), Georgia, a neighborhood
 Capitol View, South Carolina, a census-designated place